The 4 × 50 metre mixed freestyle relay competition of the 2014 FINA World Swimming Championships (25 m) was held on 6 December.

Records
Prior to the competition, the existing world and championship records were as follows.

The following records were established during the competition:

Results

Heats
The heats were held at 12:37.

Final
The final was held at 19:39.

References

4 x 50 metre mixed freestyle relay
Mixed aquatics